Music and Me is the seventh studio album by Filipino singer Sarah Geronimo, released in the Philippines on December 22, 2009 by VIVA Records. The album consists of revivals of both foreign and OPM classics. It features four of Geronimo's past singles namely—"Can This Be Love", "Very Special Love", "You Changed My Life in a Moment" and "Something New in My Life"—all of which were used as soundtracks for Star Cinema films, which became box-office hits. Geronimo personally selected the tracks featured on the album. Also included on the album is "Record Breaker", a song from Geronimo's Sunsilk endorsement.

The album was made available on digital download through iTunes on July 5, 2009. It reached platinum status after a month of its release, eventually selling 20,000 copies. In August 2010, "Love Will Keep Us Together" was included on the album as a bonus track.

Track listing

Release history

Awards 
 ASAP POP VIEWER'S CHOICE AWARDS 2010: 
Pop Album
Pop Music Video (Right Here Waiting)
Pop Movie Soundtrack: (Love Will Keep Us Together)

 PMPC STAR AWARDS FOR MUSIC: 
Best Female Recording Artist (For Music And Me)

Certifications

References 

2009 albums
Sarah Geronimo albums
Covers albums
Viva Records (Philippines) albums